The Senate Finance Subcommittee on Fiscal Responsibility and Economic Growth is one of the six subcommittees within the Senate Committee on Finance, having been created on February 16, 2011, during the 111th Congress.

Members, 117th Congress

External links
 Committee on Finance, Subcommittee page

References

Finance International Trade and Global Competitiveness